Franz Antoni Lipp (9 February 1855, Karlsruhe – 18 March 1937, Florence) was a German lawyer and politician who served as Deputy of Foreign Affairs of the Ernst Toller Government of the Bavarian Socialist Republic.
During his brief government post, he was noted for his eccentric behavior, notably because of his diplomatic telegram to Vladimir Lenin and Pope Benedict XV mentioning the disappearance of the ministry's "key to the toilet" and his attempts to declare war on Switzerland and Württemberg.

Life before the German Revolution

Franz Lipp was born on February 9, 1855, in Karlsruhe. During his early adult life, he was a journalist for the Stuttgart Observer, the German People's Party's newspaper. Lipp ran for election to the Landtag of the Württemberg in the Grand Bailiwick of Heilbronn as the candidate of the German People's Party and received support of the Social Democratic Party; he was defeated in the second round of voting, obtaining 1,767 votes out of the 3,852 cast.

During his time working with the Heilbronn newspaper, he was prosecuted for the crime of lèse-majesté and forced into exile, first in Switzerland, then later in Italy. He moved to Milan where he worked at Corriere della Sera. At 51, Lipp experienced his first mental health incident (state of agitation and delusions of persecution), which led to his hospitalization. He was later hospitalized two years later following a suicide attempt.

Several anti-Communist sources contemporary with the Bavarian Socialist Republic, based on unreliable police information, make Lipp out to be a German intelligence agent at the start of World War 1. According to French journalist Ambrose Got, Lipp engaged in espionage activities while in Italy – on his return to Germany, he publicly prided himself on having had access to military maps while feigning friendship with a geography professor from Pavia. Lipp withdrew to Switzerland upon Italy's entry into the war. It was with the German General Staff that he came into contact with foreign revolutionaries; therefore Lipp would've participated in negotiations with the revolutionary Bolshevik Karl Radek. During his time with the German General Staff, he infiltrated German revolutionary groups and informed the authorities about their activities.

Some contemporary sources assume that Lipp "took part" or "participated" in the Zimmerwald Conference in addition to the Kiental Conference. The rumor of the presence of Lipp as a spy during the Zimmerwald Conference persisted during the short period of the Bavarian Socialist Republic. Writing in 1992, the scholar Richard Sheppard considered these rumors to be unreliable, since he could not find any mention of Lipp in the literature devoted to the conference. In any case, if Lipp was present at the conference, he was not a delegate: as he was not listed as one of the ten German delegates.

Back in Germany in 1917, Lipp was noticed by defeatists remarks which led to his internment under 'protective detention' until the end of the war. A source even reports suspicion of espionage for the benefit of an enemy power.

Delegate for Foreign Affairs of the Bavarian Socialist Republic
On the night of April 6 to 7, 1919, galvanized by news of the Hungarian Soviet Republic, a revolutionary committee under the leadership of Ernst Toller proclaimed the Bavarian Socialist Republic in Munich and set up a "revolutionary national council" made up of eleven delegates.

Activist of the Independent Social Democratic Party of Germany, "little known" outside of this party, Franz Lipp was appointed to exercise the function of delegate for foreign affairs. The precise circumstances of this appointment are the subject of conflicting version between the testimonies of Ernst Toller and Ernst Niekisch: the first says that Lipp was appointed when no one knew of his abilities, the second that he was proposed by Toller, who praised his skills.

In his functions as delegate, Lipp was noted by the writing of rather surprising and strange dispatches. The allusion to the "key to the ministry's toilets" in the third is, for many historians, emblematic of the amateurism of the revolutionary government.

The first of these dispatches is a letter addressed to the apostolic nuncio in Bavaria, Eugenio Pacelli. Its content is as follows:

A second is addressed to the Bavarian Ambassador in Berlin and states:

The last is a telegram addressed to Vladimir Lenin, and also Pope Benedict XV according to some sources. The telegram goes as follows:

Finally, Franz Lipp address his colleague in charge of transport, the following letter:

In addition, the American journalist Ben Hecht – whose testimony is not known for its reliability  – recounts having seen Lipp persist in trying to get Clemenceau on the phone in order to offer him a separate peace with Bavaria During his tenure as Delegate of Foreign Affairs, according to historian Helmut Neubauer, Lipp was responsible for the release of a group of Russian prisoners of war.

A few days after his appointment and under the insistent pressure of Ernst Toler or Erich Mühsam (each of them takes credit for it in their respective memoirs ), Franz Lipp was asked to resign and left the government. On Palm Sunday, troops loyal to the republican government of Joseph Hoffmann arrested Franz Lipp during their failed attempt to retake Munich, in addition to other delegates such as Erich Mühsam and Delegate of the Interior Fritz Soldmann at the Munich Residence. This is known as the Palm Sunday Putsch.

End of life
After the Palm Sunday Putsch, Lipp's career in politics also ended and he disappeared from public life. After being arrested he was transferred from Ebrach prison to a psychiatric clinic. From this point little is known of his life until 1937. The last mentions of Franz Lipp were found in the archives of the city of Gengenbach. Where the record shows Lipp as a refugee in Florence, almost blind and taken care of by his children, forced to prove his non-Jewishness to prevent his house from being confiscated by the Gestapo. He died in Italy in 1937.

Literary works

Franz Lipp is one of the five main characters in Tankred Dorst's play . Taking some historical liberties, the play shows Lipp debate on the Jewish Question in a Chinese restaurant, attributed to Eugen Leviné whistleblowing Toller's telegram to the Pope, and includes a monologue Lipp relegated to a psychiatric hospital

References

Politicians from Karlsruhe
20th-century German journalists
Politicians from Bavaria
1855 births
1937 deaths